Scientia translates to science from Latin, and means knowledge.  It may refer to:

7756 Scientia
The Triumph of Science over Death, a sculpture of Filipino hero José Rizal
Scientia (UTFSM journal), a scientific journal published by Universidad Técnica Federico Santa María (UTFSM)
Rivista di scienza, later known as Scientia, a scientific journal founded in 1907 by Federigo Enriques and Eugenio Rignano
 Ignis Scientia, a major character in Final Fantasy XV universe.